may refer to:

 Shin Heike Monogatari (novel), a novel by Eiji Yoshikawa, translated into English as "The Heike Story: A Modern Translation of the Classic Tale of Love and War"
 Shin Heike Monogatari (film), a 1955 film based on the novel
 Shin Heike Monogatari (TV series), a 1972 television drama